Voice Of Reason is the first album by the Minneapolis band Rifle Sport. It was released in 1983 by Bob Mould's Reflex Records.

Critical reception
Maximum Rocknroll wrote: "The Gang of Four is the obvious reference point, but these guys add a more powerful and raw guitar sound to the funk rhythms, and occasionally break into more thrashy structures. The recording is excellent."

Track listing
"Words Of Reason"
"Angel Tears"
"Run & Hide"
"Danger Streets"
"Good News Week"
"Mind Over Matter"
"Hollow Men"
"Meet"
"Church"
"Keep On Walkin'"
"Correctional Facility"
"No Money"
"Eva Evita"

Personnel
J. Christopher - vocals
Gerard-Jean Boissy - guitar
Flour - bass guitar
Jimmy Petroski - drums

References

Rifle Sport albums
1983 albums
Reflex Records albums